Mestarit salilla is the first and only album by former boxer, professional wrestler and Finnish parliament member, Tony Halme. Four singles were released from this album: Viikinki (1999), Mä oon tällainen (2000), Painu pelle hiiteen (2001) and Kuningas voittamaton (2001), the first of which was certified gold in Finland.

Track listing
Viikinki
Mä oon tällainen
Painu pelle hiiteen
Kuningas voittamaton
Fysiikkaa
Jos jotain yrittää
Tony, missä sä oot
Läähätän ja läkähdyn
Turpa kii!
Tahdon olla sulle hellä (feat. Veronica)
Jos sä tartut mun hanuriin
Samurai
Alibi
Nukkumatti

References

2001 debut albums
Tony Halme albums